Calliopsini is a tribe of mining bees in the family Andrenidae. There are at least 120 described species in Calliopsini.

Genera
 Acamptopoeum Cockerell, 1905
 Arhysosage Brèthes, 1922
 Calliopsis Smith, 1853
 Callonychium Brèthes, 1922
 Litocalliopsis Roig-Alsina & Compagnucci, 2003
 Spinoliella Ashmead, 1899

References

 Michener, Charles D. (2000). The Bees of the World, xiv + 913.
 Michener, Charles D. (2007). The Bees of the World, Second Edition, xvi + 953.

Further reading

External links

 NCBI Taxonomy Browser, Calliopsini

Andrenidae